Meena Kumari may refer to:

 Meena Kumari (1933–1972), an Indian actress
 Meena Kumari (sport shooter) (born 1983), an Indian sport shooter
 Meena Kumari (weightlifter) (born 1994), an Indian weightlifter
 Meena Kumari (book), biography of actress Meena Kumari written by Vinod Mehta